Tuli is a last name that derives from multiple cultures around the world. It is predominantly found in Northern India, with respects to Finland, Turkey and the Philippines as well. As for India, the surname Tuli derives from a Khatri sub-caste in India. Khatris are traditionally `Kshatriyas` or Warriors. Tuli is a respected clan in India and members of this community are usually from Punjab in North India. They had a prominent role in the struggle for India's independence against the British Raj. In the Philippines, the Tuli surname derives from the Filipino rite of male circumcision. It has a long historical tradition and is considered an obligatory rite of passage for males; boys who have not undergone the ritual are labelled supót and face ridicule from their peers. Although not as common, the Tuli last name has been notable in Nordic regions such as Finland, translating to "fire". Alternative methods of spelling the surname Tuli in Nordic regions include Tuuli and Tóli.

Tuli may refer to the following people:
Given name
Tuli Goon (born 1988), Indian football player
 Tuli Kupferberg (1923–2010), American counterculture poet, author, cartoonist, anarchist

Surname
 Géza Tuli (1888–1966), Hungarian Olympic gymnast 
 Jake Tuli (1931–1998), South African boxer
Madhurima Tuli, Indian actress
 Neville Tuli (born 1964), Indian writer, art connoisseur and founder member of the annual Osian film festival
 Teila Tuli, also known as Taylor Wiley, American sumo wrestler
Uma Tuli, Indian social worker and educationist

See also
Thuli (given name)
Tulli

References

Indian surnames
Surnames of Indian origin
Punjabi tribes
Punjabi-language surnames
Hindu surnames
Khatri clans
Khatri surnames